Daily Jasarat is an Urdu Daily newspaper in Pakistan. It is circulated all over Pakistan with offices in Karachi, Lahore and Islamabad.

History 
The newspaper originally started in March 1970 from Multan, but soon its operations were shut down due to strikes by journalists. The newspaper reflects views of Jamaat-e-Islami Pakistan, a religious political party in Pakistan. Jasarat is the first online newspaper in the Urdu language.

Magazines 

Jasarat has two magazines:
 Sunday Magazine Site
 Weekly Friday Special Site

Columnists
There are number of prominent columnists contribute among them Shah Nawaz farooqi and Dr.Syed Mehboob's columns are 
liked widely .

References

External links
 Jasarat Official Site
 Jasarat ePaper

Daily newspapers published in Pakistan
Mass media in Karachi
Urdu-language newspapers published in Pakistan
Jamaat-e-Islami Pakistan
Jihadism